Qoruqbağı (also, Korukhbagy) is a village and municipality in the Zardab Rayon of Azerbaijan.  It has a population of 1,617.

References 

Populated places in Zardab District